Kozah is a prefecture located in the Kara Region of Togo.

The cantons (or subdivisions) of Kozah include Lama, Lassa, Soumdina, Landa, Kouméa, Tcharé, Pya, Tchitchao, Sarakawa, Yadé, Bohou, Landa-Kpinzindè, Djamdè, Atchangbadè, and Awandjélo.

References 

Prefectures of Togo
Kara Region